Gerhard Fischer may refer to:

Gerhard Fischer (inventor), contributed to the development and popularity of the hand-held metal detector
Gerhard Fischer (bobsleigh), German Olympic bobsledder
Gerhard Fischer (diplomat) (1921–2006), German diplomat and Gandhi Peace Prize laureate
Gerhard Fischer (architect) (1890–1977), Norwegian architect
Gerhard Fischer (professor) (born 1945), Center for LifeLong Learning and Design (L3D), University of Colorado, Boulder